St. Francis' College is a day and boarding school for children aged 3–18 in Letchworth, Hertfordshire. The site is within the Letchworth Conservation Area, management of which is the responsibility of the Letchworth Garden City Heritage Foundation (formerly the Letchworth Corporation). The College occupies a single campus of 3.1 hectares (7.66 acres) comprising a number of buildings, playing fields, gardens and other facilities. The College achieves outstanding academic results, alongside expert pastoral care and individual support.

History

The school buildings belong to the period from 1919 to 1938 when Letchworth was being developed as the first Garden City.  Originally built for St Christopher's School, it was acquired by the Sisters of Charity of Jesus and Mary in 1933 to found St Francis' College, a connection which is reflected in several aspects of the buildings, including the chapel.  Various buildings have been developed or improved since 1983, when the sisters withdrew.

The main entrance is into the Broadway Building, a substantial building extending to four floors, plus a basement. It is constructed from steel uprights and beams, in-filled with concrete floor slabs and brick exterior walls. It was built in 1938; the foundation stone was placed by Bishop Eugène van Rechem. Extensions were made in the 1960s to the Dining Hall and Chapel above and the JCR (junior common room) and the Chapel Annexe was added. The Broadway Building contains inter alia the residential area for the boarders, classrooms, Sixth Form Centre, Head's and her Deputy's offices and some of the College administration staff.

The Middle School Building was built in 1919 and Mrs Annie Besant, President of the Theosophical Education trust, laid what was then a cornerstone to mark the occasion. With later additions in 1924 the cornerstone became a single faced stone in the east wall of the building. It is, in part, two storeys high, organised around a central courtyard, within which is a temporary building.

The Theatre and Gymnasium were built in 1924 at the same time as the northern part of Middle School and again the foundation stone was laid by the, later, Dr Annie Besant. The Theatre has seating for 330 although the originally capacity was 600. Originally it was intended to be an Assembly Hall, but at the eleventh hour the design was altered to add a fly tower and create a theatre. The statue of St Francis, above the entrance, was added in 1937. Well known in its heyday (Olivier is believed to have made his first stage appearance here, as a babe-in-arms) the Theatre became dilapidated in the 1980s, but the auditorium and stage were refurbished in 2001/02 with further improvements to the foyer and other areas in 2003/04. The Prep. Department Building, a two-storey brick building with basement, was constructed in the 1940s with an extension in the late 1960s.

On-site recreation and sporting facilities include a 20-metre indoor heated swimming pool built in the early 1970s, five tarmac tennis/netball courts, a sports field and adjacent grassed sports/playing area. Kindergarten is provided, to the north of the Broadway Building, with an all-weather play area extending into an enclosed garden. The Upper Prep pupils have access to a grassed area known as the Loggia garden south of their classrooms in Middle School.

In 2022, the College joined the Inspired Learning Group and appointed James Nichols as Head, formerly the Deputy Head, to lead the College in the next stages of its journey.

Notable former pupils

Jennie Bond, previously the BBC Royal Correspondent, attended St Francis' College.
Nicola Fox, Associate Administrator for NASA's Science Mission Directorate
Adenike Grange, former Nigerian Minister in charge of the Federal Ministry of Health.
Claire Slater, actress, attended the school.

References

External links
School Website
ISI Inspection Reports
Ofsted Boarding Inspection Report
Parents' Association Website

Private schools in Hertfordshire
Girls' schools in Hertfordshire
Educational institutions established in 1933
1933 establishments in England
Member schools of the Girls' Schools Association
Boarding schools in Hertfordshire
Letchworth
Buildings and structures in Letchworth